"Backe, backe Kuchen" is a German-language children's rhyme. The original was in Saxony and Thuringia with several textual versions from 1840.

Text and melody 

The melody musically structures the text in the way of bar form. The framing lines follow a conventional four-bar period, where only the melodic variation in the postscript of the reprise (i.e. in the last two bars) enlivens the otherwise rather monotonous course. However, the symmetry of these run counter to the bars of the sung "middle part". This irregularity is common in folk songs when litany-like prose texts are set to music. Familiar songs that use this effect are significantly stronger than that with a relatively simple three-bar song, examples like "Backe, backe Kuchen" include "" or the Christmas carol "The Twelve Days of Christmas".

The song describes a common practice in earlier times: bakers, after baking bread, called with a horn to signal to the women of the neighbourhood that the residual heat of the oven could now be used to bake the women's own cakes. Also, where the bread was baked on certain days in the common village oven, there was a signal when the bread was removed and the residual heat of the oven could be used for baking cakes.

The text mentions the yellow colouring effect of saffron. None of the other six mentioned ingredients provides an obvious rhyme word for the modern German word "gelb" (yellow). The Middle High German form "gehl" (or "gel") is used to rhyme with "Mehl" (flour).

Cultural references 
 A 2004 episode of the German TV series Berlin, Berlin was titled after the song.
 Das Monster aus dem Schrank, debut album by German deathcore duo We Butter the Bread with Butter, has a track "Backe, backe Kuchen".

See also 

 Pat-a-cake, pat-a-cake, baker's man, an English equivalent

References

Further reading

 Ingeborg Weber-Kellermann: Das Buch der Kinderlieder. 235 alte und neue Lieder: Kulturgeschichte – Noten – Texte. Atlantis-Schott, Mainz 2002,

External links 
Backe, backe Kuchen volksliederarchiv.de, with links to collections
Text and MIDI, piano score, ingeb.org

German songs
Volkslied
German children's songs
German nursery rhymes
German-language songs
Traditional children's songs